12 Canis Majoris is a variable star located about 707 light years away from the Sun in the southern constellation of Canis Major. It has the variable star designation HK Canis Majoris; 12 Canis Majoris is the Flamsteed designation. This body is just barely visible to the naked eye as a dim, blue-white hued star with a baseline apparent visual magnitude of +6.07. It is moving away from the Earth with a heliocentric radial velocity of +16 km/s. This is the brightest star in the vicinity of the open cluster NGC 2287, although it is probably not a member based on its proper motion.

This star has a stellar classification of B7 II/III, matching the spectrum of a B-type star intermediate between a giant and bright giant. (Cidale et al. (2007) show a class of B5 V, which would indicate it is instead a B-type main-sequence star.) It is a magnetic Bp star of the helium–weak variety (CP4), with the spectrum displaying evidence for vertical stratification of helium in the atmosphere. Samus et al. (2017) classify it as an SX Arietis variable that varies in brightness by about 0.05 magnitudes over a period of 2.18045 days. It has 4.8 times the mass of the Sun and 2.73 times the Sun's radius.

References

B-type giants
B-type bright giants
B-type main-sequence stars
Helium-weak stars
SX Arietis variables
Canis Major
Durchmusterung objects
Canis Majoris, 12
049333
032504
2509
Canis Majoris, HK